Mwyngloddfa Castell is a Site of Special Scientific Interest in Ceredigion,  west Wales. The two special features are metal tolerant (Metallophyte) Lichens and mineral veins exposed in mines and tunnels.

See also
List of Sites of Special Scientific Interest in Ceredigion

References 

Sites of Special Scientific Interest in Ceredigion